Bryan Turner may refer to:
 Bryan Turner (businessman), Canadian music industry executive and film producer
 Bryan Turner (sociologist) (born 1945), British and Australian sociologist
 Bryan M. Turner, British professor of genetics in Birmingham